David Golinkin (born 1955) is an American-born conservative rabbi and Jewish scholar who has lived in Jerusalem since 1972. He is President of the Schechter Institutes, Inc., President Emeritus of the Schechter Institute of Jewish Studies and Professor of Jewish Law at the Schechter Institute of Jewish Studies in Jerusalem, Israel.

Biography
David Golinkin was born and raised in Arlington, Virginia. He made aliyah to Israel in 1972, earning a B.A. in Jewish History and two teaching certificates from the Hebrew University of Jerusalem. He received an M.A. in Rabbinics and a Ph.D. in Talmud from the Jewish Theological Seminary of America where he was also ordained as rabbi. He is the grandson of Rabbi Mordechai Golinkin, who was the Chief Rabbi of Zhitomir and Danzig and the Av Bet Din of the Rabbinical Council of New England; and the son of Rabbi Noah Golinkin who taught 200,000 North American Jews how to read the prayer book via the Hebrew Literacy and Hebrew Marathon programs.

Rabbinic and academic career
Golinkin began to teach Talmud at The Jewish Theological Seminary (JTS) in New York in 1980 and Talmud and Jewish Law at Neve Schechter, formerly the Israeli branch of JTS, in 1982. In 1987, he began to teach Talmud and Jewish Law at The Seminary of Judaic Studies (later renamed: The Schechter Institute of Jewish Studies) in Jerusalem. Since 1990, he has worked full-time as one of the leaders of the Schechter Institutes. From 1990 until 2000, he served as Assistant Dean and later as Dean of the Schechter Institute and Schechter Rabbinical Seminary.

He served as President of The Schechter Institute from 2000-2015, in which capacity he served as chief academic officer as well as chief fundraiser for all the Schechter non-profits, including TALI, Neve Schechter in Tel Aviv, and Midreshet Schechter in Ukraine. In 2015, he became the President of the Schechter Institutes, Inc. in which capacity he continues to serve as chief fundraiser, while teaching and serving as editor of all Schechter academic publications.

During Golinkin’s years at Schechter (1990ff.), the Schechter academic programs grew from 35 students to 700 students with over 1,900 graduates; the TALI school system grew from 3,000 children to 65,000 children; and Midreshet Yerushalaim (later renamed Midreshet Schechter) grew from one school to a network of camps, schools and synagogues throughout Ukraine. During his tenure as President, the Schechter Institute received accreditation from Israel's Council for Higher Education, its full-time faculty doubled and its library stacks more than tripled. Golinkin led the building campaign which built the new campus of the Schechter Institute in Jerusalem, as well as the Neve Schechter campus in Tel Aviv. Neve Schechter opened in 2012 as a synagogue and center for Jewish culture and now serves 24,000 people every year.

Golinkin is the founder and director of the Institute of Applied Halakhah at Schechter, which has published over 30 books in Hebrew, English and other languages. He directs the Center for Women in Jewish Law at Schechter, which has published five books and two series of multi-lingual booklets on women in Jewish law. He is the founder and director of the Midrash Project at Schechter, which has published eleven volumes related to Midrash. For twenty years, Golinkin served as Chair of the Va’ad Halakhah (Law Committee) of the Rabbinical Assembly which writes responsa and gives halakhic guidance to the Masorti (Conservative) Movement in Israel.

Golinkin is the author or editor of sixty-two books. Forty of his books are devoted to Halakhah (Jewish Law), his primary field of study, including Responsa of the Va’ad Halakhah of the Rabbinical Assembly of Israel (6 volumes), The Responsa of Professor Louis Ginzberg, The Status of Women in Jewish Law: Responsa (Hebrew and English editions), Responsa in a Moment (5 volumes), Aseh Lekha Rav: Responsa and Za’akat Dalot: Halakhic Solutions for the Agunot of our Time.

Twenty-two of his books are devoted to other areas of Jewish studies, such as Talmud, Midrash, and Liturgy, including Ginzei Rosh Hashanah, the second Hebrew edition of Legends of the Jews, six additional volumes of The Midrash Project, As a Driven Leaf by Rabbi Milton Steinberg (Hebrew edition), The Schechter Haggadah and The Shoah Scroll (6 editions).

He authored a column entitled “Responsa” which appeared in Moment magazine from 1990-1996. From 2000-2006 he authored a monthly email column entitled “Insight Israel” at the Schechter Institutes' website. His current email column on that website is entitled “Responsa in a Moment” and his Hebrew email column is entitled Aseh Lekha Rav.

Awards & recognition 
In 2022, he received the Nefesh B’Nefesh Bonei Zion Prize for his contributions to Israeli society in the field of Education. 

In June 2014, Prof. Golinkin was named by The Jerusalem Post as one of the 50 most influential Jews in the world. In May 2019, he received an honorary doctorate from The Jewish Theological Seminary.

Published works

 Responsa of the Va’ad Halakhah of the Rabbinical Assembly of Israel, 6 volumes, primary author and editor (1985-1998)
 Halakhah for Our Time: A Conservative Approach to Jewish Law (many editions in Hebrew, English, Spanish, French, Russian; 1986ff.)
 A Time to be Born and a Time to Die: The Laws of Mourning in Jewish Tradition, by Rabbi Isaac Klein (Hebrew and Russian editions; 1991ff.)
 Be'er Tuvia: From the Writings of Rabbi Theodore Friedman (1991)
 An Index of Conservative Responsa and Practical Halakhic Studies 1917-1990 (1992)
 Breaking New Ground: The Struggle for a Jewish Chaplaincy in Canada by Rabbi S. Gershon Levi (1994)
 The Responsa of Professor Louis Ginzberg (1996)
 Rediscovering the Art of Jewish Prayer (1997)
 Proceedings of the Committee on Jewish Law and Standards 1927-1970, 3 volumes (1997)
 Ginzei Rosh Hashanah: Manuscripts of Bavli Rosh Hashanah from the Cairo Genizah -- A Facsimile Edition With a Codicological Introduction (2000)
 Responsa in a Moment: Halakhic Responses to Contemporary Issues, 5 volumes (2000-2021)
 The Jewish Law Watch, 7 Hebrew-English booklets (2000-2003)
 The Status of Women in Jewish Law: Responsa (Hebrew, 2001; expanded English edition, 2012)
 Megillat Hashoah: The Shoah Scroll, 6 editions in 5 languages (2003-2008)
 Insight Israel: The View from Schechter, 2 volumes (2003-2006)
 To Learn and to Teach: Study Booklets Regarding Women and Jewish Law, 5 booklets in 5 languages (2004-2008)
 The High Holy Days, by Rabbi Hayyim Kieval (2004)
 Responsa and Halakhic Studies by Rabbi Isaac Klein, second edition (2005)
 Za’akat Dalot: Halakhic Solutions for the Agunot of our Time by Rabbis Monique Susskind Goldberg and Diana Villa (2006)
 Taking the Plunge: A Practical and Spiritual Guide to the Mikveh by Rabbi Miriam Berkowitz (2007)
 Torah Lishmah: Essays in Jewish Studies in Honor of Prof. Shamma Friedman (2007)
 Jewish Education for What? and other Essays by Walter Ackerman (2008)
 The Schechter Haggadah, with Joshua Kulp (2009)
 Legends of the Jews by Louis Ginzberg, second Hebrew edition (2009)
 Ask the Rabbi: Women Rabbis Respond to Modern Halakhic Questions, by Rabbis Monique Susskind Goldberg and Diana Villa (2010)
 The Student Struggle Against the Holocaust, with Rafael Medoff (2010)
 Midrash Hadash Al Hatorah edited by Gila Vachman (2013)
 Midrash Esther Rabbah edited by Joseph Tabori and Arnon Atzmon (2014)
 As a Driven Leaf by Rabbi Milton Steinberg, annotated Hebrew edition (2015)
 Truth and Lovingkindness: A Sourcebook for Spiritual Caregivers from the Midrash and Modern Jewish Thought, by Einat Ramon (Hebrew, 2015; English, 2018)
 Say Something New Each Day by Rabbi Noah Golinkin (2016)
 Kohelet Rabbah (Part I) edited by Menahem Hirshman (2016)
 Minhah L’Yehudah: Julius Theodor and the Redaction of the Aggadic Midrashim of the Land of Israel by Tamar Kadari (2017)
 Aseh Lekha Rav: Responsa, Hebrew (2019)
 Midrishei Kohelet (Part II), edited by Reuven Kiperwasser (2021)
 Bemidbar Rabbah (Part I), edited by Hananel Mack (2023)

In addition, he has published over 200 articles, responsa and sermons.

External links
Encyclopaedia Judaica, Second Edition, Volume 7, p. 739
Responsa For Today Teshuvot and other writings related to Conservative/Masorti Halacha edited by Rabbi Golinkin.
"A Conversation with Shalom Freedman" (an interview), in: Shalom Freedman, In the Service of God: Conversations with Teachers of Torah in Jerusalem, Northvale, New Jersey, 1995, pp. 61-73

Israeli Conservative rabbis
1955 births
Living people
People from Arlington County, Virginia